Vassil is masculine given name and a surname. It may refer to:

Anton Vassil, French film director
Vassil Evtimov (born 1977), French-Bulgarian basketball player
Vassil Kazandjiev (born 1934), Bulgarian composer

See also 
 Vasil, a masculine given name

Masculine given names